FC Chitwan is a Nepali professional franchise football club based Bharatpur. The club competes in the Nepal Super League, the top flight football league in Nepal.

History
The club was founded in March 2021 before commences of Nepal Super League, the first ever franchise football league in Nepal under the control of All Nepal Football Association (ANFA). The club  played their first match on 26 April 2021 against Lalitpur City FC.

2021 squad

Managerial record

Team position by years
NSL, 2021: 7th

References

2020–21 in Nepalese football
Association football clubs established in 2021
2021 establishments in Nepal
Football clubs in Nepal